Hongqi xia de dan (红旗下的蛋 literally "eggs" under the red flag), English title on CD cover Balls Under The Red Flag, is a 1994 Mandarin rock album by Cui Jian.

Track listing

References 

1994 albums
Cui Jian albums
Mandarin-language albums